Dubova (Hungarian and Czech: Dubova) is a commune located in Mehedinți County, Romania. It is one of four localities in the county located in the Banat. The commune is composed of three villages: Baia Nouă, Dubova and Eibenthal. Ethnically, it is 59% Romanian, 36.5% Czech and 3% Roma, making it the locality with the highest proportion of Czechs in Romania.

References

Communes in Mehedinți County
Czech communities in Romania
Localities in Romanian Banat
Populated places on the Danube